Sunless tanning, also known as UV filled tanning, self tanning, spray tanning (when applied topically), or fake tanning, refers to the effect of a suntan without exposure to the Sun. Sunless tanning involves the use of oral agents (carotenids), or creams, lotions or sprays applied to the skin. Skin-applied products may be skin-reactive agents or temporary bronzers (colorants).

The popularity of sunless tanning has risen since the 1960s after health authorities confirmed links between UV exposure (from sunlight or tanning beds) and the incidence of skin cancer.

The chemical compound dihydroxyacetone (DHA) is used in sunless tanning products in concentrations of 3%-5%. DHA concentration is adjusted to provide darker and lighter shades of tan. The reaction of keratin protein present in skin and DHA is responsible for the production of pigmentation.

Oral agents (carotenoids) 

A safe and effective method of sunless tanning is consumption of certain carotenoids—antioxidants found in some fruits and vegetables such as carrots and tomatoes—which can result in changes to skin color when ingested chronically and/or in high amounts. Carotenoids are long-lasting. In addition, carotenoids have been linked to a more attractive skin tone (defined as a more golden skin color) than suntan. Carotenes also fulfil the function of melanin in absorbing the UV radiation and protecting the skin. For example, they are concentrated in the macula of the eye to protect the retina from damage. They are used in plants both to protect chlorophyll from light damage and harvest light directly.

Carotenaemia (xanthaemia) is the presence in blood of the yellow pigment carotene from excessive intake of carrots or other vegetables containing the pigment resulting in increased serum carotenoids. It can lead to subsequent yellow-orange discoloration (xanthoderma or carotenoderma) and their subsequent deposition in the outermost layer of skin. Carotenemia and carotenoderma is in itself harmless, and does not require treatment. In primary carotenoderma, when the use of high quantities of carotene is discontinued the skin color will return to normal. It may take up to several months, however, for this to happen.

Lycopene
Lycopene is a key intermediate in the biosynthesis of beta-carotene and xanthophylls.

Lycopene may be the most powerful carotenoid quencher of singlet oxygen.

Due to its strong color and non-toxicity, lycopene is a useful food coloring (registered as E160d) and is approved for usage in the US, Australia and New Zealand (registered as 160d) and the EU.

Beta-carotene
Sunless-tanning pills often contain β-carotene. The American Cancer Society states that "Although the US Food and Drug Administration (FDA) has approved some of these additives for coloring food, they are not approved for use in tanning agents." Also that "They may be harmful at the high levels that are used in tanning pills."

Chronic, high doses of synthetic β-carotene supplements have been associated with increased rate of lung cancer among those who smoke.

Canthaxanthin
Canthaxanthin is most commonly used as a color additive in certain foods. Although the FDA has approved the use of canthaxanthin in food, it does not approve its use as a tanning agent. When used as a color additive, only very small amounts of canthaxanthin are needed. As a tanning agent, however, much larger quantities are used. After canthaxanthin is consumed, it is deposited throughout the body, including in the layer of fat below the skin, which turns an orange-brown color. These types of tanning pills have been linked to various side effects, including hepatitis and canthaxanthin retinopathy, a condition in which yellow deposits form in the retina of the eye. Other side effects including damage to the digestive system and skin surface have also been noted. The FDA withdrew approval for use of canthaxanthin as a tanning agent, and has issued warnings concerning its use.

Skin-reactive agents

DHA-based products
DHA (dihydroxyacetone, also known as glycerone) is not a dye, stain or paint, but causes a chemical reaction with the amino acids in the dead layer on the skin surface. One of the pathways is a free radical-mediated Maillard reaction. The other pathway is the conventional Maillard reaction, a process well known to food chemists that causes the browning that occurs during food manufacturing and storage. It does not involve the underlying skin pigmentation nor does it require exposure to ultraviolet light to initiate the color change. However, for the 24 hours after self-tanner is applied, the skin is especially susceptible to ultraviolet, according to a 2007 study led by Katinka Jung of the Gematria Test Lab in Berlin. Forty minutes after the researchers treated skin samples with high levels of DHA they found that more than 180 percent additional free radicals formed during sun exposure compared with untreated skin. Another self-tanner ingredient, erythrulose, produced a similar response at high levels. For a day after self-tanner application, excessive sun exposure should be avoided and sunscreen should be worn outdoors, they say; an antioxidant cream could also minimize free radical production. Although some self-tanners contain sunscreen, its effect will not last long after application, and a fake tan itself will not protect the skin from UV exposure. The study by Jung et al. further confirms earlier results demonstrating that dihydroxyacetone in combination with dimethylisosorbide enhances the process of (sun-based) tanning. This earlier study also found that dihydroxyacetone also has an effect on the amino acids and nucleic acids which is bad for the skin.

The free radicals are due to the action of UV light on AGE (advanced glycation end-products) as a result of the reaction of DHA with the skin, and the intermediates, such as Amadori products (a type of AGE), that lead to them. AGEs are behind the damage to the skin that occurs with high blood sugar in diabetes where similar glycation occurs. AGEs absorb and provide a little protection against some of the damaging factors of UV (up to SPF 3), However, they do not have melanin's extended electronic structure that dissipates the energy, so part of it goes towards starting free radical chain reactions instead, in which other AGEs participate readily. Overall tanner enhances free radical injury. Although some self-tanners contain sunscreen, its effect will not last as long as the tan. The stated SPF is only applicable for a few hours after application. Despite darkening of the skin, an individual is still susceptible to UV rays, therefore an overall sun protection is still very necessary. There may also be some inhibition of vitamin D production in DHA-treated skin.

The color effect is temporary and fades gradually over 3 to 10 days. Some of these products also use erythrulose which works identically to DHA, but develops more slowly. Both DHA and erythrulose have been known to cause contact dermatitis.

Professional spray tan applications are available from spas, salons and gymnasiums by both hand-held sprayers and in the form of sunless or UV-Free spray booths. Spray tan applications are also available through online retail distribution channels and are widely available to purchase for in home use. The enclosed booth, which resembles an enclosed shower stall, sprays the tanning solution over the entire body. The U.S. Food and Drug Administration (FDA) states when using DHA-containing products as an all-over spray or mist in a commercial spray "tanning" booth, it may be difficult to avoid exposure in a manner for which DHA is not approved, including the area of the eyes, lips, or mucous membrane, or even internally. DHA is not approved by the FDA for inhalation.

An opinion issued by the European Commission's Scientific Committee on Consumer Safety, concluding spray tanning with DHA did not pose risk, has been heavily criticized by specialists. This is because the cosmetics industry in Europe chose the evidence to review, according to the commission itself. Thus, nearly every report the commission's eventual opinion referenced came from studies that were never published or peer-reviewed and, in the majority of cases, were performed by companies or industry groups linked to the manufacturing of DHA. The industry left out nearly all of the peer-reviewed studies published in publicly available scientific journals that identified DHA as a potential mutagen. A study by scientists from the Department of Dermatology, Bispebjerg Hospital, published in Mutation Research has concluded DHA 'induces DNA damage, cell-cycle block and apoptosis' in cultured cells.

SIK-inhibitors 
A novel class of compounds has been found to stimulate melanogenesis in a mechanism that is independent from α-melanocyte-stimulating hormone (α-MSH) activation of the melanocortin 1 receptor (MC1 receptor). This is accomplished via small molecule inhibition of salt-inducible kinases (SIK). Inhibition of SIK increases transcription of MITF which is known to increase melanin production. Work published in June 2017 has demonstrated compounds that have efficacy when applied topically to human skin. These compounds are still however in pre-clinical stages of development. Future directions may include the incorporation of SIK-inhibitor compounds with traditional UV-blocking sunscreens to minimize UV-related DNA damage in the short term while providing longer term protection through endogenous melanin production.

Tyrosine-based products 
Tanning accelerators—lotions or pills that usually contain the amino acid tyrosine—claim that they stimulate and increase melanin formation, thereby accelerating the tanning process. These are used in conjunction with UV exposure. At this time, there is no scientific data available to support these claims.

Melanotan peptide hormones
The role of alpha-melanocyte-stimulating hormone (α-MSH) in promoting melanin diffusion has been known since the 1960s. In the 1980s, scientists at University of Arizona began attempting to develop α-MSH and analogs as potential sunless tanning agents, and synthesized and tested several analogs, including afamelanotide, then called melanotan-I.

To pursue the tanning agent, melanotan-I was licensed by Competitive Technologies, a technology transfer company operating on behalf of University of Arizona, to an Australian startup called Epitan, which changed its name to Clinuvel in 2006.

A number of products are sold online and in gyms and beauty salons as "melanotan" or "melanotan-1" which discuss afamelanotide in their marketing.

The products are not legal in any jurisdiction and are dangerous.

Starting in 2007 health agencies in various counties began issuing warnings against their use.

Other melanogenesis stimulants

Eicosanoids, retinoids, oestrogens, melanocyte-stimulating hormone, endothelins, psoralens, hydantoin, forskolin, cholera toxin, isobutylmethylxanthine, diacylglycerol analogues, and UV irradiation all trigger melanogenesis and, in turn, pigmentation.

Temporary bronzers (skin colorants)

Bronzers are a temporary sunless tanning or bronzing option. These come in powders, sprays, mousse, gels, lotions and moisturizers. Once applied, they create a tan that can easily be removed with soap and water. Like make-up, these products tint or stain a person's skin only until they are washed off.

They are often used for "one-day" only tans, or to complement a DHA-based sunless tan. Many formulations are available, and some have limited sweat or light water resistance. If applied under clothing, or where fabric and skin edges meet, most will create some light but visible rub-off. Dark clothing prevents the rub-off from being noticeable. While these products are much safer than tanning beds, the color produced can sometimes look orangey and splotchy if applied incorrectly.

A recent trend is that of lotions or moisturizers containing a gradual tanning agent. A slight increase in color is usually observable after the first use, but color will continue to darken the more frequently the product is used.

Just as with the term "sunless tanner", the term "bronzer" is likewise not defined by law, or by regulations enforced by the FDA. What is defined and regulated is the color additive DHA, or dihydroxyacetone. (Note that the "color additive" dihydroxyacetone is itself colorless.)

Air brush tanning is a spray on tan performed by a professional. An air brush tan can last five to ten days and will fade when the skin is washed. It is used for special occasions or to get a quick dark tan. At-home airbrush tanning kits and aerosol mists are also available.

Risks
Tanners usually contain a sunscreen. However, when avobenzone is irradiated with UVA light, it generates a triplet excited state in the keto form which can either cause the avobenzone to degrade or transfer energy to biological targets and cause deleterious effects.
It has been shown to degrade significantly in light, resulting in less protection over time. The UV-A light in a day of sunlight in a temperate climate is sufficient to break down most of the compound. It's important to continue wearing SPF while self-tanning, as self-tanner is generally a fake and temporary tan, and your skin is still sensitive to the sun.

If avobenzone-containing sunscreen is applied on top of tanner, the photosensitizer effect magnifies the free-radical damage promoted by DHA, as DHA may make the skin especially susceptible to free-radical damage from sunlight, according to a 2007 study led by Katinka Jung of the Gematria Test Lab in Berlin. Forty minutes after the researchers treated skin samples with 20% DHA they found that more than 180 percent additional free radicals formed during sun exposure compared with untreated skin.

A toxicologist and lung specialist at the University of Pennsylvania's Perelman School of Medicine (Dr. Rey Panettieri) has commented, "The reason I'm concerned is the deposition of the tanning agents into the lungs could really facilitate or aid systemic absorption -- that is, getting into the bloodstream. These compounds in some cells could actually promote the development of cancers or malignancies, and if that's the case then we need to be wary of them." A study by scientists from the Department of Dermatology, Bispebjerg Hospital, published in Mutation Research has concluded DHA 'induces DNA damage, cell-cycle block and apoptosis' in cultured cells.

Many self tanners use chemical fragrances which may cause skin allergies or may trigger asthma. Furthermore, some of them contain parabens. Parabens are preservatives that can affect the endocrine system.

See also 
 Indoor tanning
 Indoor tanning lotion
 Sun tanning

References

External links 

 FDA listing of approved colorants
 American Academy of Dermatology on Self Tanners

Tanning (beauty treatment)
Toiletry